"Havisham" is a poem written in 1993 by Carol Ann Duffy.

Havisham may also refer to:
Havisham (EP), 2015 album by British singer Ray BLK
Arthur Havisham, fictional character in the Charles Dickens novel Great Expectations
Miss Havisham, fictional character in Great Expectations